A Primer of Real Functions  is a revised edition of a classic Carus Monograph on the theory of functions of a real variable. It is authored by R. P. Boas, Jr and updated by his son Harold P. Boas.

References

1960 non-fiction books
Mathematics textbooks
Functions and mappings